Duppy is a word of African origin commonly used in various Caribbean islands, including Barbados and Jamaica, meaning ghost or spirit. The word is sometimes spelled duffy.

It is both singular and plural. Much of Caribbean folklore revolves around duppy. Duppy are generally regarded as malevolent spirits who bring misfortune and woe on those they set upon. They are said to mostly come out and haunt people at night, and people from around the islands claim to have seen them. The "Rolling Calf" (a scary creature said to have chains around its body), "Three footed horse", and "Ol' Hige" are examples of the more malicious spirits.

In many of the islands of the Lesser Antilles, duppy are known as jumbies. Barbados also uses the word duppy and it holds the same meaning as it does in Jamaica.

Origins
Originating in Central Africa, the duppy is part of Bantu folklore. A duppy can be either the manifestation (in human or animal form) of the soul of a dead person, or a malevolent supernatural being. But the word duppy more likely originates from the Ga language as most of the African folklore and culture in Jamaica comes from the Ashanti people (a similar Kwa speaking people also from Ghana). In the Ga language of Ghana, Adope literally means dwarf, but in Ghanaian folklore spirits are dwarves. It could also originate from the special Akan day called Dapaa, which takes 9 days after the 1st Monday of the Akan month Fwodwo. However, in Jamaica, they celebrate this 9 day tradition after someone dies. It is called "9 nights" in which they believe it takes 9 days for the spirit to return to the ancestral land. On Dapaa, it is believed that the ancestral spirits return to their homeland, a shared belief with Jamaica. The word Dapaa could have had vowel changes and became the present day Duppy, to mean ancestral spirit. In Obeah, a person is believed to possess two souls—a good soul and an earthly soul. In death, the good soul goes to heaven to be judged by God, while the earthly spirit remains for three days in the coffin with the body, where it may escape if proper precautions are not taken and appear as a duppy.

See also
 Ascalapha odorata – Species of moth known in the vernacular as a "Duppy Bat".
 Dybbuk
 Madam Koi Koi
 Mami Wata
 Tikoloshe

References

Further reading

External links
 Duppy Stories from sacred-texts.com

Caribbean legendary creatures
Ghosts
Jamaican folklore